Macrogenioglottus is a genus of frogs in the family Odontophrynidae. It is monotypic, being represented by the single species, the Bahia forest frog (Macrogenioglottus alipioi). It is endemic to the Atlantic Forest of southeastern Brazil. Its natural habitats are primary and old secondary forests, but it can also live in agroforestry systems such as cacao plantations. Habitat loss is a potential threat to this species.

References

Odontophrynidae
Monotypic amphibian genera
Endemic fauna of Brazil
Amphibians of Brazil
Taxonomy articles created by Polbot
Taxa named by Antenor Leitão de Carvalho
Amphibians described in 1946